Çankaya may refer to:

 Çankaya, Ankara (neighbourhood), a neighbourhood in Ankara, Turkey
 Çankaya, Ankara (district), a district of Ankara, Turkey, which includes the Çankaya neighbourhood
 Çankaya, İzmir, a neighbourhood in Konak district of İzmir, Turkey
 Çankaya (İzmir Metro), an underground station on the Üçyol-Bornova Line
 Çankaya Mansion, a presidential palace of Turkey
 Çankaya University,  a university in Çankaya district of Ankara, Turkey